AiT/Planet Lar is an American comic book publishing company based in San Francisco, California. It was founded in 1999 by Larry Young and Mimi Rosenheim. The company focuses on releasing original graphic novels into the mass market, although the company has published trade paperbacks of serialized mini-series originally published by other companies.

Graphic novels
All titles below are original graphic novels, unless otherwise stated.

Action/Adventure
 Aces: Curse of the Red Baron
 Astronauts in Trouble (originally serialized by Gun Dog Comics)
 The Annotated Mantooth! (originally serialized by Funk-O-Tron)
 Bad Mojo
 Black Diamond
 Black Heart Billy (originally serialized by Slave Labor Graphics)
 Channel Zero (original mini-series serialized by Image Comics)
 Channel Zero: Jennie One
 Codeflesh (originally serialized by Image Comics and Funk-O-Tron)
 Continuity
 The Couriers
 Doll and Creature
 Filler
 Full Moon Fever
 Giant Robot Warriors
 Johnny Dynamite (originally serialized by Dark Horse Comics)
 Last of the Independents
 Nobody (originally serialized by Oni Press)
 Planet of the Capes
 Proof of Concept
 Scurvy Dogs
 Shatter (originally serialized by First Comics)
 Sky Ape (originally serialized by Slave Labor Graphics)
 Smoke and Guns
 Switchblade Honey
 White Death

All-ages
 Colonia
 Electric Girl
 Jax Epoch and the Quicken Forbidden
 Ursula

Historical fiction
 Abel
 Badlands
 Dugout
 Holmes (by Omaha Perez, 104 pages, March 2008)
 Seven Sons (by Alexander Grecian and Riley Rossmo, 88 pages, 2006)
 White Death (by Robbie Morrison and Charlie Adlard, 96 pages, 2002)

Epics
 Demo (by Brian Wood and Becky Cloonan)
 Footsoldiers
 Hench
 Planet of the Capes
 Rock Bottom
 Sunset City
 True Story, Swear to God: Chances Are... (by Tom Beland)
 True Story, Swear to God: This One Goes to Eleven (by Tom Beland)
 True Story, Swear to God: 100 Stories (by Tom Beland)

Art, design, and non-fiction
 Available Light
 Badlands: The Unproduced Screenplay
 Come in Alone
 The Making of Astronauts in Trouble
 Public Domain
 Surviving Grady
 Tales from Fish Camp
 True Facts

References

External links

 
 
 

 
Lists of comics by publisher
1999 establishments in California
Publishing companies established in 1999